Alturas is a russet potato variety released in 2002 by the USDA-ARS and the Agricultural Experiment Stations of Idaho, Oregon, and Washington and it is under plant variety protection. It is a processing potato that has cold-sweetening resistance, so it can be processed directly out of storage into French fries and other frozen potato products.

Botanical features 
 Tubers are lightly russeted with brown skin
 Tubers are oval to oblong
 Tuber sprouts are green
 Flesh is white and has a shallow eyes
 Has a large, open canopy and is a late-maturing variety
 Plant stems are green with some anthocyanin pigmentation
 Has white flowers and yellow anthers
 Range of one to eight inflorescences per plant

Agricultural features 
 Higher yields and higher specific gravity than Russet Burbank
 Resistant to Verticiliium wilt and early blight
 Superior to the more common Russet Burbank in that it is more resistant to Corky ringspot, late blight, tuber net necrosis (caused by Potato leafroll virus), Fusarium dry rot, and common scab
 Susceptible to Potato virus X, Potato virus Y, bacterial soft rot, root-knot nematode, and bacterial ring rot

References 

Potato cultivars